William Rutherford Douglas (9 August 1890 – 12 November 1917) was a Scottish amateur footballer who played as a goalkeeper in the Scottish League for Queen's Park.

Personal life 
From 1906, Douglas worked for the Commercial Bank of Scotland and was appointed an accountant at the company's Biggar branch in March 1915. He served as a lance corporal in the King's Own Scottish Borderers and Army Ordnance Corps during the First World War and died of cholera in an isolation ward in Baghdad, Ottoman Iraq on 12 November 1917. Douglas was buried in Baghdad (North Gate) War Cemetery.

Career statistics

References 

Scottish footballers
Scottish Football League players
Queen's Park F.C. players
1890 births
Association football goalkeepers
People from Selkirk, Scottish Borders
Royal Army Ordnance Corps soldiers
British Army personnel of World War I
British military personnel killed in World War I
Burials at Baghdad (North Gate) War Cemetery
King's Own Scottish Borderers soldiers
Scottish accountants
NatWest Group people
Deaths from cholera
Infectious disease deaths in Iraq
20th-century Scottish businesspeople
1917 deaths
Scottish military personnel